The Berlin Palace, formally the Royal Palace, on the Museum Island in the Mitte area of Berlin, was the main residence of the House of Hohenzollern from 1443 to 1918. Expanded by order of King Frederick I of Prussia according to plans by Andreas Schlüter from 1689 to 1713, it was thereafter considered a major work of Prussian Baroque architecture. The former royal palace is one of Berlin’s largest buildings and shaped the cityscape with its  dome.

Used for various government functions after the fall of the monarchy in 1918, it was damaged during the Allied bombing in World War II, and was demolished by the East German authorities in 1950.   In the 1970s, it became the location of the modernist East German Palace of the Republic (the central government building of East Germany). After German reunification and several years of debate and discussion, particularly regarding the fraught historical legacy of both buildings, the Palace of the Republic was itself demolished in 2009 and the Berlin Palace was reconstructed beginning in 2013 to house the Humboldt Forum museum.  The reconstruction was completed in 2020.

Overview 

The Berlin Palace, also incorrectly known as the City Palace, is a building in the centre of Berlin, located on the Museum Island at Schlossplatz opposite the Lustgarten park. From the 15th century to the early 20th century, the Berliner Schloss was a royal and imperial palace that mostly served as the main residence for the Electors of Brandenburg, the kings of Prussia, and the German Emperors. Damaged during World War II and later demolished by the East German government in the 1950s, the palace has been partially rebuilt and was completed in 2020. The reconstructed palace is the seat of the Humboldt Forum, a museum for world culture which is a successor museum of the Ancient Prussian Art Chamber, which was also located in the Berlin Palace during the 19th century. The Humboldt Forum has been described as the German equivalent of the British Museum.

The palace was originally built in the 15th century, but had changed in form throughout the next few centuries. It bore features of the Baroque style; its shape, which had been finalized by the mid-18th century, is for the most part attributed to German architect Andreas Schlüter, whose first design is likely to date from 1702, even though the palace incorporated earlier parts as seen in 1688 by Nicodemus Tessin. It served as a residence to various Electors of Brandenburg. It was the principal residence and winter residence of the Hohenzollern kings of Prussia from 1701 to 1918. After the unification of Germany in 1871, it also became the central residence for the German Emperors, who also served as the kings of Prussia. After the proclamation of the Weimar Republic in 1918, the palace became a museum. In World War II, the building was heavily damaged by Allied bombings. Although it is thought to have been repairable, the palace was demolished in 1950 by the German Democratic Republic authorities following much criticism. In the 1970s, the Palace of the Republic was constructed on its site. After controversial public discussions, in 2002 the Bundestag decided to demolish the Palace of the Republic in order to make place for a partial reconstruction of the Berlin Palace.

The plans envisaged to reconstruct the entire exterior of the palace in the original style except the east side facing the Spree. The authentically reconstructed facades include various remnant sculptures and stones of the original palace. The inner courtyard facades are also modern, except three facades of the main courtyard which was originally built in 1699 (Schlüterhof). The floorplan has been designed to allow future reconstruction of notable historical rooms. The building houses the Humboldtforum museum and congress complex, and was finished in 2020.

History

History up to 1871

The palace replaced an earlier fort or castle guarding the crossing of the Spree river at Cölln, a neighbouring town which merged with Berlin in 1710. The castle stood on Fishers' Island, as the southern end of the Museum Island in the Spree is known. In 1443 Frederick II "Irontooth", Margrave and Prince Elector of Brandenburg, laid the foundations of Berlin's first fortification in a section of swampy wasteland north of Cölln. At the completion of the castle in 1451, Frederick moved there from the town of Brandenburg. The main role of the castle and its garrison in this period was to establish the authority of the Margraves over the unruly citizens of Berlin, who were reluctant to give up their medieval privileges to a monarchy. In 1415 King Sigismund had enfeoffed the Hohenzollern princes with Brandenburg, and they were now establishing their power and withdrawing electoral privileges which the cities had attained in the Brandenburg interregnum of 1319–1415.

The castle also included a chapel. In 1454 Frederick II, after having returned via Rome from his pilgrimage to Jerusalem, made the castle chapel a parish church, richly endowing it with relics and altars. Pope Nicholas V ordered Stephan Bodecker, then Prince-Bishop of Brandenburg, to consecrate the chapel to Erasmus of Formiae.

On 7 April 1465, at Frederick's request, Pope Paul II attributed to St Erasmus Chapel a canon-law College named Stift zu Ehren Unserer Lieben Frauen, des heiligen Kreuzes, St. Petri und Pauli, St. Erasmi und St. Nicolai. This collegiate church became the nucleus of today's Evangelical Supreme Parish and Collegiate Church (Berliner Dom (Berlin Cathedral)), adjoining the site of the castle.

In 1538, the Margrave Joachim II demolished the palace and engaged the master builder Caspar Theiss to build a new and grander building in the Italian Renaissance style. After the Thirty Years War (1618–1648), Frederick William (1620–1688), the "Great Elector", embellished the palace further. In 1688, Nicodemus Tessin designed courtyard arcades with massive columns in front. Not much is known about the alterations of 1690–1695, when Johann Nering was the court architect. Martin Grünberg continued the alterations in 1695–1699.

In 1699, the Elector Frederick III of Brandenburg (who took the title King in Prussia in 1701, becoming Frederick I), appointed the architect Andreas Schlüter to execute a "second plan" in the Italian manner. Schlüter's first design probably dates from 1702; he planned to rebuild the palace in the Protestant Baroque style. His overall concept in the shape of a regular cube enclosing a magnificently ornamented courtyard was retained by all the building directors who succeeded him. In 1706, Schlüter was replaced by Johann Friedrich Eosander von Göthe, who designed the western extension of the palace, doubling its size. In all essentials, Schlüter's balanced, rhythmic composition of the façades was retained, but Göthe moved the main entrance to the new west wing.

Berliner Schloss was the original location for the Amber Room, but Peter the Great of Russia admired it during a visit and in 1716 Frederick William I presented the room to Peter as a gift.

Frederick William I, who became king in 1713, was interested mainly in building up Prussia as a military power, and dismissed most of the craftsmen working on the Stadtschloss. As a result, Göthe's plan was only partly carried out. Nevertheless, the exterior of the palace had come close to its final form by the mid-18th century. The final stage was the erection of the dome in 1845, during the reign of Frederick William IV. The dome was built by Friedrich August Stüler after a design by Karl Friedrich Schinkel. Subsequent major works were limited to the interior, engaging the talents of Georg Wenzeslaus von Knobelsdorff, Carl von Gontard and many others.

The Stadtschloss was itself the epicenter of the Revolution of 1848 in Prussia. Huge crowds gathered outside the palace to present an "address to the king" containing their demands for a constitution, liberal reform and German unification. Frederick William emerged from the palace to accept their demands. On 18 March, a large demonstration outside the Stadtschloss led to bloodshed and the outbreak of street fighting. Frederick William later reneged on his promises and reimposed an autocratic regime. From that time onwards, many Berliners and other Germans came to see the Stadtschloss as a symbol of oppression and "Prussian militarism".

History during the German Empire, Weimar Republic and Nazi Era (1871–1945)

In 1871, King William I was elevated to the status of German Emperor (Kaiser) of a united Germany, and the Stadtschloss became the symbolic heart of the German Empire. The Empire was (in theory) a constitutional state, and from 1894 onwards, the new Reichstag building, the seat of the German parliament, came to not only rival, but overshadow the Stadtschloss as the Empire's centre of power. In conjunction with Germany's defeat in World War I, William II was forced to abdicate, both as German Emperor and as King of Prussia. In November 1918, the Spartacist leader, Karl Liebknecht, declared the German Socialist Republic from a balcony of the Stadtschloss, ending more than 400 years of royal occupation of the building.

During the Weimar Republic, parts of the Stadtschloss were turned into a museum, while other parts continued to be used for receptions and other state functions. Under Adolf Hitler's National Socialist (Nazi) Party, which laid to rest monarchist hopes of a Hohenzollern restoration, the building was mostly ignored. During World War II, the Stadtschloss was twice struck by Allied bombs: on 3 and 24 February 1945. On the latter occasion, when both the air defences and fire-fighting systems of Berlin had been destroyed, the building was struck by incendiaries, lost its roof, and was largely burnt out.

Postwar and Demolition

The end of the war saw the Stadtschloss a burned-out shell of its former glory, although the building remained structurally sound and much of its interior decoration was still preserved. It could have been restored, as many other bombed-out buildings in Central Berlin later were. The area in which it was located was within the Soviet Union zone, which became the German Democratic Republic. The building was used for a Soviet war movie ("the Battle of Berlin") in which the Stadtschloss served as a backdrop, with live artillery shells fired at it for the realistic cinematic impact.

The new socialist government declared the Stadtschloss a symbol of Prussian militarism, although at that time there appeared to be no plans to destroy the building. Some parts of it were in fact repaired and used from 1945 to 1950 as an exhibition space. A secret 1950 GDR Ministry of Construction report, only rediscovered in 2016, calculated that reconstruction of the damaged Palace could be achieved for 32 million GDR marks.  But in July 1950 Walter Ulbricht, the new General Secretary of the Central Committee of the Socialist Unity Party of Germany, announced the demolition of the palace. Despite objections, its removal commenced in September 1950, the process taking four months and consuming 19 tons of dynamite.  So solid was its construction that the dome and its entire mount remained intact even after the rest of the building fell to the ground. Only one section was preserved, a portal from the balcony from which Karl Liebknecht had declared the German Socialist Republic. It was later added to the Council of State building (Staatsratsgebäude), with an altered cartouche, where it forms the main entrance. The empty space where the Stadtschloss had stood was named Marx-Engels-Platz and used as a parade ground.

In 1964, the GDR built a new Staatsrat or Council of State building on part of the site, incorporating Liebknecht's balcony in its facade. From 1973 to 1976, during the government of Erich Honecker, a large modernist building was built, the Palast der Republik (Palace of the Republic), which occupied most of the site of the former Stadtschloss.

Reunification
Shortly before German reunification in October 1990, the Palast der Republik was found to be contaminated with asbestos and was closed to the public. After reunification, the Berlin city government ordered the removal of the asbestos, a process which was completed by 2003. In November 2003, the German federal government decided to demolish the building and leave the area as parkland pending a decision as to its ultimate future. Demolition started in February 2006 and was completed in 2009.

The demolition was lengthy because of the presence of additional asbestos, and because the palace acted as a counterbalance to the Berliner Dom, across the street, on the unstable grounds of the Museum Island. East Germans resented the demolition, especially those for whom the Palace of the Republic had been a place of fond memories, or who felt a sense of dislocation in a post-communist world.  Part of the palace formed a Stasi surveillance centre that recorded the visitors and staff.

From 2008, until the commencement of construction in 2013, the large area of the original Schlossplatz became a grassed field, laid out on minimal lines, with wooden platforms. At the same time, the Berlin Monument Authority (Landesdenkmalamt) undertook extensive archaeological excavations. Parts of cellars that had been situated in the south-west corner of the former Palace were discovered and it was decided these would be preserved and made accessible to visitors as an "archaeological window".

Reconstruction

The debate

Following reunification, a 20-year-long debate commenced as to whether the palace should be reconstructed, and whether this should be in part or whole. Pro-reconstruction lobby groups argued that the rebuilding of the Stadtschloss would restore the unity and integrity of the historic centre of Berlin, which includes the Berliner Dom, the Lustgarten and the museums of Museum Island.  Opponents of the project included those who advocated the retention of the Palast der Republik on the grounds that it was itself of historical significance; those who argued that the area should become a public park; and those who believed that a new building would be a pastiche of former architectural styles; would be an unwelcome symbol of Germany's imperial past, and would be unacceptably expensive for no definite economic benefit. They also argued that it would be impossible to accurately reconstruct the exterior or interiors of the building since neither detailed plans nor the necessary craft skills are available. Others disputed this, claiming that sufficient photographic documentation of both existed when it was converted to a museum following 1918.

The ideological divide was epitomized by the two following groups. The Association for the Preservation of the Palace of the Republic (Verein zur Erhaltung des Palastes der Republik) championed a renovation of the GDR building that would incorporate a re-creation of the principal western facade of the City Place, for a multipurpose "people's center" similar to the Pompidou Center in Paris. The Berlin City Palace Sponsoring Association (Förderverein Berliner Stadtschloß) argued for the complete external reconstruction of the City Palace, as they considered it the only option that would restore the aesthetic and historic ensemble of Berlin's heart.<ref name="reconstruction2003">Goebe,Rolf J. Berlin's Architectural Citations: Reconstruction, Simulation, and the Problem of Historical Authenticity, PMLA, Modern Language Association of America, 2003</ref> It also rejected suggestions that the proposed meticulous reconstruction would be an unauthentic 'Disney' replica, drawing attention to the fact that most centuries-old stone buildings are, by dint of aging and repair, at least partial reconstructions; and that the argument that the present time can only represent itself in its own architectural language, is simply ideology. It also drew attention to the Venice Charter observation that "historic edifices have a material age and an immaterial significance" – an importance that transcends time, and justifies their reconstruction to preserve a vital part of urban identity and historical memory, provided that sufficient documentation for a truly authentic copy exists.

Towards construction

An important driving force behind the reconstruction was businessman .Whitney, Craig R. . "A Berlin Palace Stirs in Its Grave". The New York Times, 12 July 1993. In 1992, he and Kathleen King von Alvensleben founded, what evolved to be the Berlin City Palace Sponsoring Association – which became the most influential lobby group. The Association accumulated plans that had been believed lost, and funded a research project at the Technical University of Berlin to measure surviving photos and drawings of the palace to create precise architectural plans. In 1993, on the world's largest scaffolding assembly, it audaciously erected a trompe-l'oeil mockup of two frontages of the Stadtschloss facade on a 1:1 scale on plastic sheeting. Privately funded by donations and sponsorship, this coup de théâtre stood for a year and half. Showing a vision of central Berlin lost for fifty years, and how the palace could provide the missing link to the historical ensemble of the Zeughaus, the Altes Museum, and the Berlin Cathedral, the spectacle brought the debate to a temporary climax in 1993–94. While opinion continued to remain divided, the association succeeded in winning over many politicians and other key figures to its efforts.

In view of the previous opposition, including high cost, and most importantly, the psychological and political objections, successive German governments had declined to commit themselves to the project. However, by 2002 and 2003, cross-party resolutions of the Bundestag reached a compromise to support at least a partial rebuilding of the Stadtschloss.

In 2007, the Bundestag made a definitive decision about the reconstruction. According to this compromise, which had been drawn up by a commission, three façades of the palace would be rebuilt, but the interior would be a modern structure to serve as a cultural museum and forum. An architectural competition was held, and in 2008 the jury chose the submission by the Italian architect Franco Stella. Some of the internal spaces in Stella's design follow the exact proportions of the original state rooms of the palace; this would allow for their reconstruction at a later date should this be desired. The reconstruction also reproduces the original metre-thick width of the outer walls. These have been rebuilt as a sandwiched construction as follows: an inner retaining wall of concrete, followed by a layer of insulation, and an outer wall of brick, sandstone and stucco which replicates the original. Reconstruction of the Renaissance-gabled Pharmacy Wing, which connected to the Stadtschloss on the north side, would be another possible future project.

German government budget cuts delayed the construction of the "Humboldtforum", as the new palace was titled. The foundation stone was finally laid by President Joachim Gauck in a ceremony on 12 June 2013 which heralded the launch of a €590M reconstruction project.

In 2017, there was a debate whether to feature a cross on the dome of the palace, in relation to adhering historical accuracy or secularism. Afterwards, a statue of Antinous was installed on the palace facade in the Schlüterhof courtyard. However, the cross was installed on the top of the dome on 29 May 2020.

On completion in 2020, the building housed a museum containing collections of African and other non-European art, as well as two restaurants, a theatre, a cinema, and an auditorium.

In July 2022, the bronze reliefs originally by Otto Lessing in 1897 and mounted in 1903 were reconstructed and mounted on the Eosander Portal, the originals (like many of the exterior designs), having vanished after 1950, the demolition of the City Palace. These were soon followed by the mounting of the reconstructed plaques with the words of Friedrich II, Elector of Brandenburg, and Friedrich I of Prussia, the first king of Prussia.

The surrounding area around the Berlin Palace which included the granite Adlersäule (Eagle Pillar), the bronze Rossebändiger (Horse Tamers), and the Neptunbrunnen (Neptune Fountain), collectively called the Schlossplatz, are planned to be redesigned by 2023 in a modern way, that will still be able to bring back the mentioned original items surrounding the palace if desired. In front of it is planned the Denkmal für Freiheit und Einheit (Monument to Freedom and Unity).

See also
List of Baroque residences
Humboldt Forum
Neuer Marstall

Literature
 Albert Geyer: Geschichte des Schlosses zu Berlin (1443–1918).'' Nicolai Verlag, Berlin 2010. . (German)

References

External links

Berlin Palace Association 
Donation website

Houses completed in 1451
Houses completed in 1845
Buildings and structures in Mitte
Palaces in Berlin
Royal residences in Berlin
Berlin City Palace
Berlin City Palace
Berlin City Palace
Buildings and structures in Berlin destroyed during World War II
Building reconstruction projects in Germany
Rebuilt buildings and structures in Berlin
Former palaces in Germany
Proposed museums
Buildings and structures demolished in 1950